Kafadar is a surname. Notable people with the surname include:

Cemal Kafadar (born 1954), professor of Turkish studies at Harvard University
Karen Kafadar, American statistician and president of American Statistical Association